AbanteCart is a New Jersey-based e-commerce technology and business solution provider, created by Pavel Rojkov in 2010 and released to the public in November 2011. It is a free open source electronic commerce application and community based project. AbanteCart is licensed under the Open Software License (OSL) and its foundation is based on PHP and MySQL database.

Development of the 1.2 and 2.X versions branch of AbanteCart is coordinated publicly on GitHub.

On June 17, 2014, AbanteCart Software was Certified by Bitnami for automated application deployments  on the Amazon EC2 cloud. AbanteCart Bitnami stacks are compatible with CentOS.

AbanteCart uses external services for fraud management such as FraudLabs to review customer orders and payments processing like PayPal, Authorize.Net and CardConnect.

References

External links

AbanteCart Review: Not For Newbies But Here’s Why Should Check It Out, October 26, 2018. Digital.com Review by Brenda Barron
Find out what users are saying about AbanteCart, March 23, 2018. Capterra
 

Web applications
Free e-commerce software
Free software programmed in PHP